Kenoayoak Pudlat is a former territorial level politician from Lake Harbour, Northwest Territories, now Kimmirut, Nunavut

Pudlat was elected to the Baffin South electoral district in the 1991 Northwest Territories general election. He defeated long serving incumbent Joe Arlooktoo. Pudlat did not return to the Legislature in 1995.

External links
Nunavut Votes 2004 Hudson Bay profile

Members of the Legislative Assembly of the Northwest Territories
Living people
Year of birth missing (living people)
People from Kimmirut
Inuit from the Northwest Territories
Inuit politicians
Inuit from Nunavut